Brevicella is a genus of moths of the family Crambidae. It contains only one species, Brevicella emarginata, which is found in New Guinea.

References

Acentropinae
Crambidae genera
Monotypic moth genera
Taxa named by George Hamilton Kenrick